Hendrik Bosch (born 26 February 1776 – 9 March 1864) was a Dutch military officer and colonial government official, who in his later life made a career in the administration on the Dutch Gold Coast.

Biography
Bosch was born in Spanbroek to Bernardus Bosch and Elisabeth Struis. He began his military career in 1800 and participated in various military campaigns. As a soldier in the French Napoleonic Army, he participated in the Russian Campaign of 1812 and in the German Campaign of 1813. He then switched sides and fought for the Netherlands against France in Napoleon's Hundred Days. During the Belgian Revolution, Bosch defended the citadel of Liège.

Major general Jan Verveer, who was asked by the Dutch government to reform the colonial administration of the Dutch Gold Coast in the wake of the Dutch-Ahanta War, recommended Bosch to be installed as governor of the colony:

Bosch eagerly accepted the office and was installed by royal decree of 23 March 1838, arriving in Elmina in August of the same year. He did not serve his full term and returned to Europe on 13 March 1840.

Hendrik Bosch died in Amsterdam on 9 March 1864.

Personal life
Hendrik Bosch married Maria Lohman (born 8 August 1786 in The Hague, died 6 September 1863), with whom he had three sons and one daughter. When their son Bernardus died at the age of 45 in September 1853 in Delft, both Hendrik and Maria were still alive and residents of Nootdorp. The civil registration for 1850-1880 lists them as living there with their daughter Hentrietta (*1832 Delft; left in 1860), their son Willem (*1829 Luik), and a maid, but does not show a departure or death date for either parent.

Decorations
Order of the Netherlands Lion (Knight)
Metal Cross 1830-1831

Notes

1776 births
1864 deaths
Colonial governors of the Dutch Gold Coast
Dutch military personnel of the Napoleonic Wars
Knights of the Order of the Netherlands Lion
People from Opmeer